The Arabian sand gazelle (Gazella marica) or reem is a species of gazelle native to the Middle East, specifically the Arabian and Syrian Deserts.

Distribution and conservation
Today it survives in the wild in small, isolated populations in Saudi Arabia, the United Arab Emirates, Oman, and southeastern Turkey. Small numbers may also be present in Kuwait, Iraq, Jordan, and Syria. The total population of wild sand gazelles is thought to be less than 3,000. Significantly more are held in captivity, reserves, or breeding programs, perhaps more than 100,000.

Taxonomy
Until recently, the sand gazelle was considered a subspecies of the goitered gazelle (Gazella subgutturosa), as Gazella subgutturosa marica. A 2010 genetic study established that it was a distinct lineage, and it is now considered a separate species. Further genetic analysis reported in 2012 found that the sand gazelle was closely related to two North African gazelles, Cuvier's gazelle (Gazella cuvieri) and the rhim (Gazella leptoceros), perhaps even belonging to a single species.

References 

Gazella
Mammals described in 1897
Taxa named by Oldfield Thomas